The Rural Municipality of Loon Lake No. 561 is a rural municipality (RM) in the Canadian province of Saskatchewan within Census Division No. 17 and  Division No. 6.

History 
The RM of Loon Lake No. 561 incorporated as a rural municipality on January 1, 1978.

Geography

Communities and localities 
The following urban municipalities are surrounded by the RM.

Villages
 Loon Lake
 Makwa

The following unincorporated communities are within the RM.

Organized hamlets
 Little Fishing Lake

Localities
 Barthel
 Flat Valley
 Golden Ridge
 Horse Head
 Morin Creek
 Mudie Lake
 Murphy Lake
 Peck Lake
 Peerless
 Whelan

Demographics 

Attractions 
 Bronson Provincial Forest
 Bronson Forest Provincial Recreation Site
 Fowler Lake Recreation Site
 Steele Narrows Provincial Park
 Big Bear Trail Museum

Government 
The RM of Loon Lake No. 561 is governed by an elected municipal council and an appointed administrator that meets on the second Wednesday of every month. The reeve of the RM is Greg Cardinal while its administrator is Erin Simpson. The RM's office is located in Loon Lake.

Transportation 
 Saskatchewan Highway 21
 Saskatchewan Highway 26
 Saskatchewan Highway 55
 Saskatchewan Highway 304
 Saskatchewan Highway 699
 Loon Lake Airport

See also 
List of rural municipalities in Saskatchewan

References 

Loon Lake

Division No. 17, Saskatchewan